State Route 115 (SR 115) is a state highway in the U.S. state of California. It runs in Imperial County from Interstate 8 (I-8) southeast of Holtville to SR 111 in Calipatria. The routing was added to the state highway system in 1933, and was constructed by 1934; SR 115 was officially designated in the 1964 state highway renumbering.

Route description

SR 115 begins with an interchange at I-8. It then heads northwest through the community of Date City and briefly enters the city of Holtville. Near its exit of the city, it intersects a few county roads before turning due north and continuing through rural Imperial County, eventually beginning an overlap with SR 78 and continuing west. East of Alamorio, SR 115 turns due north again, and intersects CR S26. After a few miles, the highway turns due west, reaching its north end in Calipatria at SR 111.

SR 115 is part of the California Freeway and Expressway System, but is not part of the National Highway System, a network of highways that are considered essential to the country's economy, defense, and mobility by the Federal Highway Administration. SR 115 is eligible for the State Scenic Highway System, but it is not officially designated as a scenic highway by the California Department of Transportation. In 2013, SR 115 had an annual average daily traffic (AADT) of 830 between Wirt Road and East Avenue, and 5,800 between the intersection of Walnut Avenue and 5th Street and the intersection of the highway with Holt Avenue, the latter of which was the highest AADT for the highway.

History
The routing from Brawley to Calipatria was added to the state highway system in 1933; following the completion of the road from Yuma to San Diego, increased tourism and growth led to the development of more highways in Imperial County, and the construction of the system was expected to aid in future growth, according to the Los Angeles Times. The northern section above SR 78 was legislatively defined as Route 187; the part of the highway south of Route 187 was defined as Route 201.

The roadway had been constructed by 1934, though the state described the majority of it as a "low type" road. The portion from Route 78 to US 80 was paved by 1938, and the entire road had been paved by 1940. By 1956, the routing was signed as Route 115. By 1961, the highway continued just west of Holtville to an intersection with US 80 (later I-8), where it ran concurrently with US 80 briefly before heading south to a junction with SR 98 in Bonds Corner.

SR 115 was officially defined in the 1964 state highway renumbering. The segment south of SR 78 was altered in 1972; the portion between I-8 south to SR 98 near Bonds Corner was deleted, and the definition was clarified from "Route 8 near Holtville" to "Route 8 southeasterly of Holtville". By 1975, the routing of SR 115 had been adjusted to end at I-8, south of the old US 80 routing.

Future
The 2007 Imperial County Transportation Plan proposed the improvement of SR 115 from the Evan Hewes Highway north to SR 111 from a two-lane highway to a four-lane expressway.

Major intersections

See also

References

External links

California @ AARoads - State Route 115
Caltrans: Route 115 highway conditions
California Highways: Route 115

115
State Route 115